Red Shirts (Italian:Camicie rosse) is a 1952 French-Italian historical drama film directed by Goffredo Alessandrini and Francesco Rosi and starring Anna Magnani, Raf Vallone and Alain Cuny. The title refers to the historical Redshirts. It is also known as Anita Garibaldi. The film portrays the life of Anita Garibaldi (1821–1849), the wife of Italian unification leader Giuseppe Garibaldi.

Cast
Anna Magnani as Anita Garibaldi
Raf Vallone as Giuseppe Garibaldi
Alain Cuny as Bueno
Jacques Sernas as Gentile
Carlo Ninchi as Ciceruacchio
Enzo Cerusico as Il figlio di Ciceruacchio
Gino Leurini as Andrea
Mario Monosilio as Giovanni
Marisa Natale as Rosa
Emma Baron as La signora Guiccioli
Carlo Duse as Bonnert
Cesare Fantoni as Il generale Oudinot
Rodolfo Lodi as Il colonello Forbes
Bruno Smith as Gustavo Mioni
Pietro Tordi as Carlo Ferrari
Piero Pastore Pietro Fadini
Luigi Esposito as L'oste
Serge Reggiani as Lantini

References

Bibliography 
Moliterno, Gino. The A to Z of Italian Cinema. Scarecrow Press, 2009.

External links 

1952 films
French historical drama films
Italian historical drama films
1950s historical drama films
1950s Italian-language films
Films directed by Goffredo Alessandrini
Films set in the 1840s
Films set in Italy
Films with screenplays by Suso Cecchi d'Amico
Cultural depictions of Giuseppe Garibaldi
1952 drama films
Films scored by Enzo Masetti
French black-and-white films
Italian black-and-white films
1950s Italian films
1950s French films